William Denny may refer to:
 William Denny (MP) (1578–1625), English lawyer and politician
 William Denny Jr. (born 1930), American politician in the Mississippi House of Representatives
 William Denny and Brothers, British shipbuilder based in Dumbarton, Scotland
 William Alexander Denny or Bill Denny (medical researcher) (born 1943), New Zealand chemist
 William F. Denny (c. 1860–1908), American vaudeville performer and pioneer recording artist
 William H. P. Denny (1811–1890), American newspaper editor and publisher and politician in Ohio
 William Joseph Denny or Bill Denny (1872–1946), South Australian politician

See also 
 William D. Denney (1873–1953), American businessman and politician, Governor of Delaware